Danielle Ryan (born 1 November 1983) is an Irish actress, philanthropist and entrepreneur.

Early life
Ryan is the daughter of Capt. Cathal Ryan and granddaughter of Tony Ryan, founder of Ryanair.

Career

Acting
Ryan graduated from the Royal Academy of Dramatic Art in 2006. In 2007, she made her theatrical stage debut in Food to positive reviews. In the same year, she appeared in How About You, a film based on a collection of stories by Maeve Binchy and The Trial of Tony Blair. She has also appeared in Vivarium, which premiered at the 2019 Cannes Film Festival, The Silencing, Wild Mountain Thyme alongside Jamie Dornan, Emily Blunt and Jon Hamm. and Mr. Malcolm's List.

Her television work includes her role as Alice in Magpie Murders, Vicky Boynes in Harry Wild and Agent Sophia Elias in The Professionals along with roles in Doctors, The Tudors, Casualty (TV series) and Fair City. Ryan is credited as a producer on six productions, including Grace Jones: Bloodlight and Bami, Song of Granite, which was selected as the Irish entry for the Best Foreign Film at the 90th Academy Awards, Rialto, which premiered at the Venice Film Festival in 2019 and L.O.L.A., which wrapped in November 2020.

Business
In 2013, Ryan launched the brand ROADS, which encompasses luxury fragrances, book publishing and film production.  She has said that in setting up ROADS, she wanted to find a way of crossing over from the artistic and creative worlds into tangible products.

There are 18 Eau de Perfum, 5 candles and more than 50 books for sale under the ROADS label around the world.

Philanthropy

The Lir Academy
Trinity College Dublin discontinued its acting degree in 2007, leaving Ireland with 'no high-level full-time actor training'. In response, Ryan founded The Lir, Ireland's National Academy of Dramatic Art, which she announced in 2009.

The Lir is part of Trinity College Dublin and has an association with the Royal Academy of Dramatic Art in London. It welcomed its first students in 2011, its opening attracting press coverage from the New York Times. Ryan funded a purpose-built premises for the Lir, which is located in Grand Canal Dock in Dublin.

The Lir offers conservatoire training for actors along with degrees in stage management and technical theatre as well as Masters in Fine Art for playwriting, theatre directing and stage design.

UNICEF
Ryan announced in 2011, at the United Nations General Assembly, that her family would donate $14 million to help some of the most vulnerable children in Sri Lanka. This was the largest single private donation ever made to UNICEF, for which Ryan received the UNICEF Ireland's children's award from former Irish president Mary Robinson in 2012.

The donation was used to rebuild the health and education infrastructure in four towns in the North of Sri Lanka  that had been destroyed by the Sri Lankan Civil War.

She continues to work with UNICEF, giving keynote speeches on their behalf and acting as a member of the UNICEF International Council.

Other
Ryan has donated to Our Lady's Children's Hospital, Crumlin  and Temple Street Children's University Hospital, both in Dublin.

She also provided funding to One in Four, a charity in Ireland which helps people affected by childhood sexual abuse.

Filmography

Acting

Producing

References

External links
 

Alumni of RADA
21st-century Irish philanthropists
Irish film actresses
Irish soap opera actresses
Irish stage actresses
Irish television actresses
Living people
Place of birth missing (living people)
1983 births